Green grabbing, also known as green colonialism, is the foreign appropriation of land and resources for environmental purposes, resulting in a pattern of unjust development. The purposes of green grabbing are varied; it can be done for ecotourism, conservation of biodiversity or ecosystem services, for carbon emission trading, or for biofuel production. It involves governments, NGOs, and corporations, often working in alliances. Green grabs can result in local residents' displacement from land where they live or make their livelihoods.

Definition and purpose
"Green grabbing" was first coined in 2008 by journalist John Vidal, in a piece that appeared in The Guardian called "The great green land grab". Social anthropologist Melissa Leach notes that it "builds on well-known histories of colonial and neo-colonial resource alienation in the name of the environment". Green grabbing is a more specific form of land grabbing, in which the motive of the land grab is for environmental reasons. Green grabbing can be done for conservation of biodiversity or ecosystem services, carbon emission trading, or for ecotourism. Conservation groups might encourage members of the public to donate money to "adopt" an acre of land, which goes towards land acquisition. Companies who engage in carbon emission trading might employ a green grab to plant trees—the resulting carbon offset can then be sold or traded. One program, Reducing emissions from deforestation and forest degradation (REDD+), compensates companies and countries for conserving forests, though the definition of forest also includes forest plantations consisting of a single tree species (monoculture).

Green grabbing can also be done for the production of biofuels. Biofuel production efforts, led by the US and European Union, have been a main driver of land grabbing in general. The International Land Coalition states that 59% of land grabs between 2000 and 2010 were because of biofuels.

Occurrence
Indebted governments may be especially vulnerable to green grabs, as they may agree to privatize and sell public assets to avoid bankruptcy. Green grabs involve large tracts of land consisting of thousands or millions of hectares. Green grabs have occurred in Africa, Latin America, and Southeast Asia. Environmental activists and critics have also warned that the Green New Deal and COP26 could exacerbate green colonialism.

Actors
Modern green grabs are often enacted through alliances between national elites, government agencies, and private actors. Examples can include international environmental policy institutions, multi-national corporations, and non-governmental organizations (NGOs). These varied actors align to achieve common goals; for example, ecotourism initiatives can result in the alignment of tourism companies, conservation groups, and governments. Conservation groups can also align with military or paramilitary groups to accomplish shared aims. Actors can also include entrepreneurs trying to profit from eco-capitalism, such as companies developing forest carbon offset projects, biochar companies, and pharmaceutical businesses.

Implications
Green grabbing can result in the expulsion of indigenous or peasant communities from the land they live on. In other cases, the use, authority, and management of the resources is restructured, potentially alienating local residents. Evictions due to palm oil biofuel has resulted in the displacement of millions of people in Indonesia, Papua New Guinea, Malaysia, and India. The practice has been criticized in Brazil, where the government referred to one land acquisition NGO as "eco-colonialist". A shaman of the Yanomami tribe published a statement through Survival International saying, "Now you want to buy pieces of rainforest, or to plant biofuels. These are useless. The forest cannot be bought; it is our life and we have always protected it. Without the forest, there is only sickness." The head of the Forest Peoples Programme Simon Colchester said, "Conservation has immeasurably worsened the lives of indigenous peoples throughout Africa," noting that it resulted in forced expulsion, loss of livelihoods, and violation of human rights.

See also 
 Fortress conservation

References

Ecological economics
Ecotourism
Environmental economics
Indigenous rights
Nature conservation
Neocolonialism